Fatima Sana Shaikh (born 11 January 1992) is an Indian actress, who works in Hindi films. Shaikh appeared as a child artist in such films as Chachi 420 (1997) and One 2 Ka 4 (2001). In 2016, she portrayed wrestler Geeta Phogat in the top-grossing sports film Dangal. She has since starred in the streaming anthology projects Ludo (2020), Ajeeb Daastaans (2021), and Modern Love Mumbai (2022).

Early and personal life 
Fatima Sana Shaikh was born on 11 January 1992 born and brought up in Mumbai. Her mother, Raj Tabassum, is from Srinagar, and her father, Vipin Sharma, is from Jammu. While her father was raised Hindu and her mother raised Muslim, Shaikh identifies as an atheist. She had received experience in photography prior to becoming an actress.

Career

Shaikh began her career as a child artist in Chachi 420 and One 2 Ka 4. Years later, she played Zoya in the Indian drama film Tahaan, which received "The German Star of India award" at "Bollywood and Beyond" festival at Stuttgart, Germany in 2009.

Shaikh was selected for Nitesh Tiwari's biographical sports film Dangal along with Sanya Malhotra, who had never acted before. Shaikh was chosen to portray Geeta Phogat. To prepare for her role, she watched several videos on wrestling to understand "how wrestlers move, walk, their body language". Both Malhotra and Sheikh went through five rounds of auditions, physical training and workshops with Tiwari and Aamir Khan. They were trained by coach and former wrestler Kripa Shankar Patel Bishnoi. Released in 2016, Dangal received critical acclaim and became the highest-grossing Indian film ever with earnings of more than  worldwide.

She played Zafira Baig, a warrior-archer Thug in the epic action-adventure film, Thugs of Hindostan. Shaikh will be featuring in a Hindi remake of Tamil movie Aruvi. The Hindi version is being produced by Applause Entertainment.
Fatima will be seen as Indira Gandhi, along with Vicky Kaushal and Sanya Malhotra in an untitled 2022 Sam Manekshaw biography film directed by Meghna Gulzar.

Filmography

Films

Television

Music videos

Accolades

Media 
Shaikh was ranked in The Times Most Desirable Women at No. 48 in 2020.

References

External links

 
 

1992 births
Living people
Kashmiri people
Kashmiri actors
Actresses in Hindi cinema
Indian film actresses
Actresses from Mumbai
Indian child actresses
Indian television actresses
Indian soap opera actresses
Actresses in Hindi television
Indian atheists
Actresses from Hyderabad, India
Kashmiri atheists